Rob Williams (born 21 January 1985, in Taplow) is a British rower who competed at the 2012 Summer Olympics.

Rowing career
Williams was part of the British squad that topped the medal table at the 2011 World Rowing Championships in Bled, where he won a bronze medal as part of the lightweight coxless four with Richard Chambers, Chris Bartley and Paul Mattick.

He won a silver medal at the 2012 Olympic Games as part of the men's lightweight four.

References

 

1985 births
Living people
English male rowers
British male rowers
People from Taplow
Rowers at the 2012 Summer Olympics
Olympic rowers of Great Britain
Olympic silver medallists for Great Britain
Olympic medalists in rowing
Medalists at the 2012 Summer Olympics
World Rowing Championships medalists for Great Britain